The TWA Flight Center, also known as the Trans World Flight Center, is an airport terminal and hotel complex at New York City's John F. Kennedy International Airport (JFK). The original terminal building, or head house, operated as a terminal from 1962 to 2001 and was adaptively repurposed in 2017 as part of the TWA Hotel. The head house is partially encircled by a replacement terminal building completed in 2008, as well as by the hotel buildings. The head house and replacement terminal collectively make up JetBlue's JFK operations and are known as Terminal 5 or T5.

The TWA Flight Center was designed for Trans World Airlines by Eero Saarinen and Associates and was erected between 1959 and 1962. It featured a prominent wing-shaped thin shell roof supported by four "Y"-shaped piers. Inside was an open three-level space with tall windows enabling views of departing and arriving jets. Two tube-shaped red-carpeted departure-arrival corridors extended outward from the terminal, connecting to the gates. Roche-Dinkeloo, a successor firm to Saarinen's company, designed an expansion in 1970. The TWA Flight Center continued to operate as an air terminal until 2001. Its design received much critical acclaim; both the interior and the exterior of the head house were declared New York City Landmarks in 1994, and it was added to the National Register of Historic Places in 2005.

The encircling Terminal 5 addition was designed by Gensler and constructed between 2005 and 2008. It contains the 26 active gates at Terminal 5, as well as numerous restaurants and stores. Although portions of the original complex have been demolished, the head house remains standing. The Port Authority of New York and New Jersey (PANYNJ), which operates JFK Airport, had once intended the original structure as an entrance to the replacement terminal. In 2016, the Port Authority began converting the original head house into the TWA Hotel, which opened in 2019 with two additional buildings adjacent to the T5 addition.

Architecture  
The head house of the TWA Flight Center, designed by Eero Saarinen and his associates, is a pioneering example of thin-shell construction, consisting of a reinforced concrete shell roof supported at the corners. The design incorporates elements of the Futurist, Neo-futurist, Googie and Fantastic architectural styles. It is located at the middle of a curve in one of JFK Airport's service roads, in front of the elevated AirTrain JFK people mover. The key collaborators from the Saarinen office included Kevin Roche, Cesar Pelli, Norman Pettula, and Edward Saad. Warren Platner was largely responsible for the interiors. To engineer the roof, Saarinen collaborated with Charles S. Whitney and Boyd G. Anderson of the firm Ammann & Whitney. The general contractor was Grove Shepherd Wilson & Kruge. Arup was the structural engineer; Jaros, Baum & Bolles provided MEP engineering; and Langan was the civil engineer on the project.

The Terminal 5 (also known as T5) addition, which is connected to the TWA Flight Center, is a  facility designed by Gensler. It contains 26 gates that can accommodate 250 flights per day, and 20 million passengers annually.

Form 

The form of the TWA Flight Center's head house is designed to relate to its small wedge-shaped site, with walkways and gates placed at acute angles. Saarinen described the head house form as being like the "Leonardo da Vinci flying machine", according to his associate Kevin Roche. Radiating out from the head house are two departure-arrival passenger tubes extending southeast and northeast. The TWA Flight Center was one of the first to use enclosed passenger jetways, which extended from "gate structures" at the end of each tube. In the original plans, aircraft would be available via the "Flight Wing", a single-story building that passengers would have to walk to at ground level. The jetways removed the need for passengers to walk on the ground and sheltered passengers from inclement weather.

The current JetBlue terminal and the TWA Hotel buildings are located east of the original head house. The terminal's entry hall is composed of two arms that wrap around the TWA Flight Center's head house in a crescent shape. The two passenger tubes from the original design were retained, but the original gate structures were destroyed. T5 contains 26 gates.

Exterior

Roof 

The TWA Flight Center's head house is a two-story structure. The roof's thin concrete shell was designed to span a wide space using as little material as possible. The roof is composed of four concrete shells: two upward-slanting shells at the edges, which resemble wings, and two smaller shells slanting downward toward the front and back of the structure. The rooftop shells converge at the center, where each of the four shells supports the others. Skylights are placed within the gaps between each shell. The building's main entrance is on the land side, where the roof projects over a sidewalk (formerly a driveway) with a scupper.

The roof weighs  in total.

Facade 
The main portion of the head house's facade is made of large green-tinted glass walls. These glass walls were coated with a dark purple mylar film before 2005. Single-story wings extend outward from the main terminal to the north and south and contain several door openings within the concave walls. Inside these wings are maintenance areas.

Interior

Original head house 
Though the head house is two stories tall, it contains an intermediate level, joined to the lower level by a central staircase and to the upper level by four peripheral staircases. Ceramic tiles line the walls and floors. The TWA Flight Center incorporated many innovations upon its completion, including closed circuit television, a central public address system, baggage carousels, electromechanical split-flap display schedule board and baggage scales, and gates that were somewhat distant from the main terminal. The intermediate level contains an area facing east, where passengers could originally see the tarmac. By the early 1990s, to comply with the Americans with Disabilities Act of 1990, a switchback ramp had been added between the lower level and the intermediate level.

The ticket counter and baggage claim areas were placed at ground level, on the other side of the curbside canopy, to maximize convenience for passengers. A sculpted marble information desk rose from the floor as a single slab. There are also mechanical, service, and office areas in a partial basement under the intermediate level, as well as a tunnel that led to Flight Wing 1.

A concrete balcony on the upper floor spans the central staircase from the lower floor to the intermediate level. The TWA operated its Ambassador Club on the northern (left) portion of the upper floor. Three restaurants were located on the southern (right) portion of the upper floor: the Constellation Club, Lisbon Lounge, and Paris Café. There were also offices on the upper level, north and south of the public areas.

Terminal 5 and TWA Hotel 
Terminal 5 has a  retail area with 22 food and drink concessions, 35 stores, free wireless Internet access, a children's play area, and a 1,500-space parking garage. As the first airline terminal at JFK designed after the September 11, 2001, attacks, T5 contains 20 security lanes, one of the largest checkpoints in a US airline terminal.

Two buildings, north and south of the newer T5 structure, encircle the original head house to the east. The hotel is outside the sterile area of Terminal 5, meaning that visitors can only access the hotel before going through T5 security or after arrival at T5. The hotel's decorations, replicas of the original furnishings, include brass lighting, walnut-accented furnishings, and rotary phones. The hallways contain red carpeting, evocative of the color of the furniture in the original TWA lounge. The rooms also contain modern amenities such as blackout curtains and multiple-pane soundproof windows.

Passageways 

The two passageways leading from the head house are completely enclosed and cross a service roadway that serves T5 and the TWA Hotel. The passageway leading southeast was called Flight Tube 2, while the passageway leading northeast was called Flight Tube 1. These tubes are covered in concrete, with an elliptical cross section as well as indirect lighting. Original plans called for the passageways to be designed as bridges with glass ceilings; each passage would have two moving walkways, one in each direction, with a stationary hallway in between. As a cost-saving measure, the passageways were ultimately not designed with moving walkways.

The tubes originally led to Flight Wings 1 and 2. The passages were  higher at the flight wings than at the head houses. Following the opening of the TWA Hotel, the tubes connect the head house to additional rooms in the hotel, as well as to T5.

Flight wings 

Flight Tube 2 connected to Flight Wing 2, from the 1962 Saarinen design, while Flight Tube 1 connected to Flight Wing 1, from a 1967–1970 expansion designed by successor firm Roche-Dinkeloo. Both sections were characterized as being "violin"-shaped, with jetways extending outward from the end of each wing. The flight wings had a base made of concrete and plaster, as well as a passenger concourse cantilevered above the base.

Flight Wing 2, shaped like a multi-sided polygon, was the smaller of the two structures, with seven gates; it contained utilitarian decor as well as a small flight operation center above the passenger area. Two bridges led to departure lounges (labeled gates 39 and 42), which could both fit 100 passengers; these had a red-and-oyster color scheme with furnishings. Flight Wing 1 was much larger than Flight Wing 2, having been built to accommodate Boeing 747 jumbo jets, and had 10 gates. Flight Wing 1 contained four levels, which served passengers, Federal Inspection Services, and operations; there were also baggage claim carousels in Flight Wing 1's basement, connected to the head house via people mover. Both flight wings were demolished with the construction of T5 in the 2000s.

History

New York International Airport, also known as Idlewild Airport, began construction in 1943 on the site of the Idlewild Beach Golf Course in southern Queens, and had been operating since 1948 with a single terminal building and a control tower. The following year, Transcontinental and Western Airlines (TWA) signed a lease with the Port of New York Authority (later the Port Authority of New York and New Jersey, or PANYNJ), which operated Idlewild Airport. TWA had begun flying internationally in 1946 from New York's LaGuardia Airport with flights to Paris, London, Rome, Athens, Cairo, Lisbon, and Madrid. In 1950, as both a domestic and international carrier, the former Transcontinental and Western Airlines changed its name to Trans World Airlines. By 1954, Idlewild had the highest volume of international air traffic of any airport globally.

Development 
In 1955, the "Terminal City" master plan was developed for Idlewild Airport. All of the major airlines, including TWA, would build their own terminals, while smaller airlines would be served from an International Arrivals Building. When the locations of each airline's terminal was announced, TWA and Pan Am were each assigned a spot on one side of the International Airlines Building. TWA's hangar was on the opposite side of its assigned lot. Under the leadership of TWA president Ralph S. Damon, TWA hired Eero Saarinen and his Detroit-based firm to design the TWA Flight Center. Even though Saarinen's firm was simultaneously working on 15 other projects, he agreed to take the commission. A writer for Interiors magazine described TWA as having "vision and confidence" for the project.

Planning and design 

Eero Saarinen's wife Aline recalled that her husband saw most other air terminals as being ugly, shoddy, and inconvenient. Saarinen wanted the new terminal to have a practical purpose and not only "interpret the sensation of flying", but also "express the drama and specialness and excitement of travel". Damon sought for "the spirit of flight" to be encapsulated in the design. Saarinen's firm started researching other airports to collect data, and they also visited Grand Central Terminal, the United States' busiest railroad station, to observe passenger circulation patterns. The team found that passengers within Grand Central Terminal often traveled in curving paths, even though the terminal itself was rectangular.  TWA anticipated that at peak hours, the terminal would accommodate a thousand passengers, with two thousand departures and arrivals per hour. Additionally, TWA needed fourteen positions at the terminal for large jets.

The Saarinen team started devising designs for the terminal's form in February 1956. Although the site assigned to TWA was not the airline's first choice for an Idlewild terminal, the design team took advantage of the site to design a highly visible terminal. One of Saarinen's original designs was sketched on the back of a restaurant menu, when he and Aline were eating dinner with Time magazine's associate editor Cranston Jones. Unhappy with initial designs, Saarinen asked TWA for more time and took an additional year to resolve the design. Roche said that one initial design had called for an oval shell upon four piers, but that Saarinen had rejected that plan as awkward. Furthermore, engineer Abba Tor had warned that a single slab of concrete might crack.

Saarinen's team first created 3D models of the planned terminal, then drew sketches of the structure; this contrasted with the design processes of more traditional buildings, in which architects drew sketches before creating their 3D models. Saarinen's team created several wire, cardboard, and clay models of the terminal's roof, constructed at various scales. One early model for the terminal was based on Jørn Utzon's winning proposal for the Sydney Opera House's architectural design competition, for which Saarinen had been one of the judges. Saarinen had originally envisioned the roof as a single shell, but he refined the design twice before ultimately devising the plan with four shells. The final model for the shell may have been inspired by one of Saarinen's breakfasts, a grapefruit that he pushed down at the center. During another discussion, Roche used a saw to bisect one of the models, creating the inspiration for the roof's four shells. In creating the TWA Flight Center's roof, Saarinen may also have been inspired by Minoru Yamasaki's design for St. Louis Lambert International Airport's main terminal, his father Eliel Saarinen's design for Helsinki Central Station; and McKim, Mead & White's design for the original New York Penn Station.

The interior was modeled next; since the space was to be symmetrical, Saarinen's team only created drawings for half the interior. Roche said the area around the center staircase was remodeled at least ten times. In addition to around 130 possible plans created by the Saarinen office for the terminal, contractors provided hundreds of their own drawings. Cross-sections and contour maps were also devised. Saarinen's team had devised 600 sketches of the building, but only 200 of these sketches were used in the final design. The resulting plan was characterized as providing a "smooth and luxurious switch from ground transportation to planes".

Final plans and construction 
By November 1957, TWA had announced a design with a projected cost of $12 million (equivalent to $ million in ). Aline Saarinen worked with TWA to coordinate marketing activities centered on the terminal from the building announcement to its completion in 1962. The plans were revised in 1958 after Saarinen's original design was determined to be too expensive. Though both flight wings had been included in the original plan, only Flight Wing 2 was initially built as a cost-saving measure; the other wing was not completed until 1970. The passageways were to have a glazed roof and moving walkways in the original plan, but these features were absent in the final construction, and two "arms" flanking the head house had been removed.

Construction began in June 1959, involving 14 engineers and 150 workers. A grid was devised to manage the steel-pipe scaffolding at the construction site, and 5,500 supports were used in the scaffolding. The contractors also prefabricated 27 different wedge shapes, creating 2,500 wedges in total. Although the project employed carpenters with "no special skill", the procedures were precise enough that they allowed for a maximum deviation of only  from the plan. The roof was poured as a single form starting on August 31, 1960; the work took 120 hours. The "Y"-shaped piers required hundreds of additional drawings to fabricate. By the middle of that year, the contractors were partially relying on computer calculations to complete the project.

By the end of 1960, the roof was fully supported by the four "Y"-shaped piers, and the scaffolding was removed. By April 1961, when only the concrete vaults had been completed, Saarinen remarked that "If anything happened and they had to stop work right now and just leave it in this state, I think it would make a beautiful ruin, like the Baths of Caracalla". Saarinen died later that year while undergoing surgery. His associates, principal designer Kevin Roche and John Dinkeloo formed Roche-Dinkeloo, which worked to complete the building.

Original terminal

By March 1962, the incomplete TWA terminal was being used by passengers to get to planes. The unfinished terminal building was also used for a fundraising benefit that April. The completed terminal was dedicated on May 28, 1962. Most other major U.S. airlines had completed their Idlewild terminals sooner: after the opening of the International Arrivals Building in 1957, United Airlines and Eastern Air Lines opened their own terminals in 1959, followed by American Airlines and Pan American World Airways (Worldport) in 1960, and Northwest Airlines and TWA in 1962. The National Airlines Sundrome would be last, in 1969. The airport's name was changed to John F. Kennedy International Airport in 1963. Despite being finished relatively late compared to other terminals at JFK Airport, the TWA Flight Center incorporated many novel features for its time, which influenced the design of other airport terminals.

The terminal as completed had seven aircraft positions, six of which were available from Flight Wing 2; the other boarding position was available from a temporary structure attached to Flight Tube 1. As with many terminals designed before the advent of jumbo jets, increased passenger traffic and security issues, the design proved difficult to update as air travel evolved; terminal gates close to the street made centralized ticketing and security checkpoints difficult. International flights at JFK during the 1960s were routed through the International Arrivals Building, and the structure attached to Flight Tube 1 was functionally inadequate. By 1967, TWA announced that it would build Flight Wing 1 on the northwest to accommodate wide-body aircraft, hiring Roche-Dinkeloo to design the $20 million expansion. Work started in 1968, and the concrete shell was finished by that December. Flight Wing 1 opened on February 25, 1970, but the wing was not dedicated until March 20, when international passengers could pass through the terminal directly. With the addition of Flight Wing 1 came the expansion of the ticketing counter in the head house. The baggage handling area was expanded, and the new addition was connected to the basement of Flight Wing 1.

By 1979, TWA had built a traffic island with a canopy to provide shelter for passengers waiting for ground transport. The shelter, constructed by firm Witthoefft & Rudolf, won the Albert S. Bard Award for architectural excellence. A wooden walkway, intended as a temporary structure, was built in the 1980s to connect to the Sundrome when TWA expanded its operations there. By 1992, the TWA Flight Center was in "tawdry condition", with parts of the structure appearing actively deteriorated. The PANYNJ considered demolishing the building, but the New York City Landmarks Preservation Commission (LPC) hosted public hearings in 1993 to determine whether to protect the TWA Flight Center, and the LPC designated the terminal as an exterior and interior landmark in 1994. Instead, the PANYNJ started considering plans for what would become the T5 expansion. Elastomeric coating was added to the roof in 1999 to prevent leakage.

TWA deteriorated financially during the 1990s, and after it eliminated many routes in 1996, moved most of its New York operations to the TWA Flight Center. TWA eventually sold its assets to American Airlines in October 2001. For three months, American Airlines still operated flights out of the TWA Flight Center. American Airlines ceased flight operations at the terminal in December 2001 and allowed its TWA-era lease to expire in January 2002. By then, airport officials saw the terminal as functionally outdated. As a bi-state agency, the PANYNJ could legally bypass the LPC designation and demolish parts of the terminal.  Preservationists expressed concern over the fact that the terminal could be significantly modified.

Abandonment and preservation

After preservationists raised concerns, the PANYNJ proposed an alternative that would preserve the tubes and build a new structure east of the existing building. The PANYNJ still wished to destroy one or both of the flight wings. By August 2001, the PANYNJ presented its first proposal, which entailed converting the head house into a restaurant or conference center, while encircling the existing building with one or possibly two new terminals. The concept received opposition from the Municipal Art Society (MAS), as well as architects Philip Johnson and Robert A.M. Stern. The opposition suggested the building, which brought passengers into immediate view of the sky and aircraft beyond, would be "strangled" if wrapped by another terminal, and that wrapping the Saarinen head house with another terminal would not preserve the spirit of the building but would mummify it "like flies in amber."  Philip Johnson, speaking at the 2001 presentation, said of the proposal:

By late 2002, there was still no agreement on the usage of the TWA Flight Center, except that the head house and passageways would be preserved. The following year, the PANYNJ and JetBlue agreed on a plan that would include reopening the TWA Flight Center and constructing a new 26-gate Terminal 5 behind the TWA Flight Center. At the time, JetBlue was operating out of the adjacent Terminal 6, the Sundrome, and was the airport's fastest growing carrier. The PANYNJ and JetBlue came to an agreement on the construction of the new terminal itself in August 2004.

In the time that the TWA Flight Center stood disused, it was utilized for brief events. Shortly after its closure, the head house was used for the filming of the 2002 film Catch Me If You Can. In 2004, the dormant head house briefly hosted an art exhibition called Terminal 5, featuring the work of 19 artists from 10 countries. The theme of the show featured work, lectures, and temporary installations drawing inspiration from the terminal's architecture; it was supposed to have run from October 1, 2004, to January 31, 2005. The show closed abruptly after the building itself was vandalized during its opening gala. The building was added to the National Register of Historic Places in 2005.

Later use

New JetBlue terminal
In December 2005, the PANYNJ began construction of the T5 facility behind and partially encircling Saarinen's head house. Peripheral portions of the head house were demolished to make space for a larger 26-gate facility designed by Gensler. Originally, there were also tentative plans to renovate one of the departure lounges, known as The Trumpet. During the construction of T5, The Trumpet was lifted and moved  at a cost of $895,000, only to be later demolished when the project's budget prioritized renovating the head house. The head house was renovated to remove asbestos and replace deteriorated sections of the facility. The head house was planned to be used as an approach to the new T5 facility, and both buildings would be collectively known as Terminal 5.

T5 reopened on October 22, 2008, with JetBlue using an abstraction of the Saarinen terminal's gull-wing shape as the official logo for the event, an abstraction of the new terminal floor plan for the signage and counting down the reopening via Twitter. At the time of the T5 opening, JetBlue and PANYNJ had yet to complete renovation of the original Saarinen head house, and the building had stood empty while they decided what its future role should be. Early proposals included a conference center, an aviation museum, and a restaurant, or a place to check in for flights departing from the newer JetBlue T5 building.

Conversion of head house into hotel

In April 2015, The Wall Street Journal reported that JetBlue and its partner, a hotel developer, were negotiating for the rights to turn the head house into a hotel. Three months later, state governor Andrew Cuomo confirmed that the Saarinen building would become part of the TWA Hotel, a new on-site hotel for airport passengers. Construction began in December 2016. The structures on either side of the head house were demolished, though the head house was retained, and additional structures were built. During the head house's conversion into a hotel, many original details, such as the custom ceramic floor tiles and the 486 variously-shaped window panels, were replaced with replicas of the originals. The departure board from the original construction was also restored. The hotel opened on May 15, 2019.

Impact 
Under TWA president Damon's guidance, Saarinen had designed the terminal as "a building that starts your flight with your first glimpse of it and increases your anticipation after you arrive". As such, Saarinen had used similar design features for the interior and exterior. The airline wanted a structure "represent[ing] a daring departure from conventional air terminal concepts".

Critical reception

Contemporary criticism 
Shortly after the plans for the TWA Flight Center were announced in 1957, The New York Times described the plan as "hav[ing] a startling effect" for first-time visitors, but "not so revolutionary" inside. Another newspaper said the TWA terminal was "planned to combine the functional realities of a jet-age air terminal with the aesthetic drama of flight". Many contemporary media compared the terminal to "a bird in flight". Architectural Forum (which praised the terminal) and Architectural Review (which criticized it) both characterized the design as a "concrete bird". Saarinen said the building's resemblance to a bird was a coincidence, despite privately describing the structure as a "Leonardo da Vinci flying machine". The architect Robert Venturi said that Saarinen's designs evolved "from vocabulary rather than from function" and that, at the time, many of Saarinen's peers still adhered to the philosophy of form following function.

Even when the TWA Flight Center was under construction, it was often discussed in the architectural media, and the Museum of Modern Art ran an exhibit on the building in 1959. The completion of the terminal prompted a large amount of architectural commentary, most of it positive. While the TWA terminal's design had several critics and skeptics, it was still described as being appropriate in the context of the Jet Age. Architect Robert A. M. Stern called the head house a symbolic "Grand Central of the jet age". Ada Louise Huxtable, architecture critic for The New York Times, saw the TWA Flight Center as a bright spot in the "mediocrity" of JFK Airport. The interior was also praised. Critic Edgar Kaufmann Jr. in 1962 called the interior "one of the few major works of American architecture in recent years that reaches its full stature as an interior". Ken Macrorie of The Reporter compared the tarmac-facing waiting room to a railroad hub's waiting area and alluded to the similarities with the city's original Pennsylvania Station. 

One major critic of the design was historian Vincent Scully, who disliked Saarinen's use of "whammo shapes" at the TWA Flight Center and Dulles International Airport. British critic Reyner Banham questioned the practicality of the terminal's design, which did not clearly link "function and symbol", but he said that the TWA terminal was no worse than any other airport terminal. Italian engineer and architect Pier Luigi Nervi was also skeptical of the design, saying that the structure was "too heavy and elaborate for the problem it seeks to solve".

Retrospective criticism 
Adulation for the original design continued through the 1990s, long after its completion. Progressive Architecture magazine stated in 1992 that the terminal "represented a high point not only in the design of air terminals, but in the exercise of corporate responsibility". Two years later, New York Times critic Herbert Muschamp called the TWA Flight Center "the most dynamically modeled space of its era". In a 2005 book about Saarinen's work, Jayne Merkel said "the building did for TWA what the Saint Louis Arch [...] would eventually do for Saint Louis". According to Merkel, it was not until the Port Authority proposed demolishing the terminal for T5 that "the full impact of the building was revealed".

When the newer T5 was announced in 2005, JFK Airport's vice president of redevelopment described the planned structure as "a very practical, very efficient building". T5 was also described as "hyper-efficient" and a "monument to human throughput", and a reviewer said T5 "might be the [...] best" terminal at JFK Airport.

Awards and landmark designations 
When the terminal was completed, it received numerous accolades and awards, including from the Queens Center of Commerce and the New York Concrete Industrial Board. Architectural Forum included the TWA Flight Center and the Pepsi-Cola Building as part of a 1962 exhibition of ten of the "world's most significant modern buildings". The American Institute of Architects gave the terminal an Award of Merit in 1963, and it was featured in magazines printed internationally. In addition, Saarinen won the AIA Gold Medal posthumously in 1962.

The New York City Landmarks Preservation Commission held public hearings on the possibility of designating the TWA Flight Center's exterior and interior as official city landmarks in 1993. The head house's exterior and interior were designated as landmarks on July 19, 1994, though the exterior designation excluded the gate structure attached to the northeastern tube. The Municipal Art Society nominated the facility to the National Trust for Historic Preservation's list of the 11 Most Endangered Places in America in 2004, after the terminal's closure. On September 7, 2005, the National Park Service listed the TWA Flight Center on the National Register of Historic Places.

See also
 List of thin shell structures
 List of New York City Designated Landmarks in Queens
 National Register of Historic Places listings in Queens

References

Notes

Citations

Sources

External links

 
 
 1962 Saarinen head house with 2008 Gensler-designed Jetblue Terminal

Airport terminals
Aviation in New York City
Buildings and structures on the National Register of Historic Places in New York City
Concrete shell structures
Eero Saarinen structures
Expressionist architecture
Googie architecture
Historic American Buildings Survey in New York City
JetBlue
John F. Kennedy International Airport
Modernist architecture in New York City
National Register of Historic Places in Queens, New York
New York City Designated Landmarks in Queens, New York
New York City interior landmarks
Trans World Airlines
Transport infrastructure completed in 1962
Transportation buildings and structures in Queens, New York